

Predicted and scheduled events

 January 19 – February 2: 2024 Winter Youth Olympics in Gangwon, South Korea.
 February 1: Finland's new president will take office if the election is decided in the first round.
 February 14: 2024 Indonesian general election
 March 17: 2024 Russian presidential election
 June 14 – July 14: UEFA Euro 2024 in Germany
 July 7: general election for Mexico's president
 July 26 – August 11: 2024 Summer Olympics in Paris, France.
August 17: Nusantara will become the new capital of Indonesia, replacing Jakarta.

 October 27: 2024 Uruguayan general election; incumbent President Luis Lacalle Pou will not be eligible for re-election.
 November 5: 2024 United States presidential election; incumbent President Joe Biden will be eligible for re-election.

Date unknown 
 January: 2024 Bangladeshi general election.
 April: Indian general election
 May: 2024 Eurovision song contest, site unknown.
 mid-May 2024: 2024 European Parliament election.
 mid-May 2024: 2024 Indian general election.
 Autumn 2024: 2024 Moldovan presidential election; incumbent President Maia Sandu will be eligible for re-election.
 November – 2024 Romanian presidential election; incumbent President Klaus Iohannis will not be eligible for re-election.

References

 

Leap years in the Gregorian calendar